José Tomás Ponce Rosas (born 1 July 1952) is a Honduran politician. In 2009 he was elected to represent the Yoro Department as a deputy in the 2010–2014 session of the National Congress of Honduras, representing the Liberal Party of Honduras.

References

1952 births
Living people
People from Yoro Department
Deputies of the National Congress of Honduras
Liberal Party of Honduras politicians